Gert Louis Lamartine (20 July 1898 in Uiffingen – 9 January 1966 in Stuttgart) was a German painter, sculptor and interior designer.

Biography

Gert Louis Lamartine, born under the name Gerhard Ludwig Gustav Lamerdin, was the son of Gustav Lamerdin and Bertha née Müller, and related to Alphonse de Lamartine. He studied painting at the University of Heidelberg and at the Academy of Fine Arts, Karlsruhe.

In 1923 he emigrated to Canada and set up an interior decoration studio in the Saint Helen's Island in Montreal. He worked for more than forty years from that studio. He and his team decorated numerous houses in the Montreal area. They also decorated famous hotels like the Château Frontenac in Quebec City, the Château Laurier in Ottawa, the Château Lake Louise in Banff, Alberta and the Queen Elizabeth Hotel in Montreal.

Most of his paintings were impressionistic and abstract. He also painted portraits, figure studies, capes and still lifes. He selected his subjects from countries that he has travelled to (e.g. Japan, China, Caribbean, Portugal, Spain and others). His art was exhibited in various places, including the Montreal Museum of Fine Arts in 1959 and the Toit de Chaume gallery in Piedmont, Quebec outside Montreal in 1964. He also made mosaics and sculptures.

References
Bibliography
 Colin S. MacDonald: Dictionary of Canadian Artists, Volume 3, 1991, p. 719. 
 Evelyn de Rostaing McMann: Biographical Index of Artists in Canada, 2002, p. 128. 
 Evelyn de Rostaing McMann: Montreal Museum of Fine Arts, formerly Art Association of Montreal: Spring Exhibitions, 1880–1970, 1988, p. 351
 Sylvie Roy, Cyndie Campbell: Artistes Au Canada: Une Liste Collective Des Dossiers D'artistes, 1999 
 Allgemeines Künstlerlexikon, Bio-bibliographischer Index (The artists of the world bio-bibliographical index), 2000, p. 28. 
Notes

External links 
 Gert Louis Lamartine on Artnet.com

1898 births
1966 deaths
20th-century German painters
20th-century German male artists
German sculptors
People from Baden-Württemberg
German emigrants to Canada
German male sculptors
German male painters
German abstract artists